Mueang Pattani is the capital district (amphoe mueang) of Pattani province, southern Thailand.

History
This area was the center of the Pattani Kingdom. In the reign of King Rama II, the king ordered the kingdom divided into seven cities (mueang): Pattani, Yaha, Yaring, Nong Chik, Ra-ngae, Raman, and Sai Buri. It was made a district in 1901. Pattani was the central district of Monthon Pattani when King Rama V created the monthon in 1906.

In 1917 the district was renamed Sabarang, the name of the central sub-district. In 1938 the name was changed back to Mueang Pattani.

Geography
Neighboring districts are (from the east clockwise): Yaring, Yarang, and  Nong Chik. To the north is the Gulf of Thailand.

The important water resource is the Tani River.

Administration

Central administration 
Mueang Pattani is divided into 13 sub-districts (tambons), which are further subdivided into 66 administrative villages (mubans).

Local administration 
There is one town (thesaban mueang) in the district: Pattani consisting of sub-districts Sabarang, Anoru, and Chabang Tiko.

There is one sub-district municipality (thesaban tambon) in the district: Rusa Milae consisting of sub-district Rusa Milae.

There are nine sub-district administrative organizations (SAO) in the district:
 Bana consisting of sub-district Bana.
 Tanyong Lulo consisting of sub-district Tanyong Lulo.
 Khlong Maning consisting of sub-district Khlong Maning.
 Kamiyo consisting of sub-district Kamiyo.
 Barahom consisting of sub-district Barahom.
 Paka Harang consisting of sub-district Paka Harang.
 Talubo consisting of sub-district Talubo.
 Baraho consisting of sub-district Baraho.
 Puyut consisting of sub-district Puyut.

References

External links
amphoe.com on Mueang Pattani District

Districts of Pattani province